Spara, Gringo, spara (internationally released as The Longest Hunt and Shoot, Gringo... Shoot!) is a 1968 Italian Spaghetti Western directed by Bruno Corbucci.

It is the first western directed by Bruno Corbucci (brother of western specialist Sergio Corbucci), and except the parodistic and bizarre The Three Musketeers of the West it is his only western. The title song "Rainbow... vorrei... vorrei" is performed by Little Tony. Alex Cox in his book 10,000 Ways to Die refers to the film as "derivative and boring", "a reminder that talent as a director is not inheritable, or a family trait."

Plot
US-American adventurer Stark has been sentenced to death in a Mexican village. A rich Mexican rancher saves him from getting hanged but he must return the favour by saving the rancher's son Fidel. He is told that Fidel has somehow been persuaded or even forced to join a gang. Stark shall bring Fidel back to his father. The American believes that the rancher is worried sick about his son's well-being. When he delivers Fidel he understands just on time that things are very different. The rancher intends to whitewash his honour by getting rid of Fidel because he's ashamed of having an illegitimate son.

Cast 
 Brian Kelly as Stark
 Keenan Wynn as Major Charlie Doneghan
 Erika Blanc as Jocelyn
 Folco Lulli as Don Hernando Gutierrez
 Fabrizio Moroni as Fidel
 Linda Sini as Dona Sol Gutierrez
 Krista Nell as Sheila
Rik Battaglia as Cpt. Norton
Luigi Bonos as Sgt. Peck
Enzo Andronico as Gunther
 Ignazio Leone as Doctor
 Luca Sportelli

References

External links

1968 films
Spaghetti Western films
1960s English-language films
English-language Italian films
1960s Italian-language films
Films directed by Bruno Corbucci
1968 Western (genre) films
Films shot in Almería
1960s multilingual films
Italian multilingual films
1960s Italian films